William Jewell may refer to:

 William Jewell (educator) (1789–1852), American politician, physician and educator, namesake of William Jewell College, Missouri
 William Jewell (cricketer) (1855–1927), English cricketer
 William Jewell (canoeist) (born 1941), American sprint canoer
 William Jewell (footballer) (fl. 1884–1908), English footballer
 William Henry Jewell (1840–1912), mayor of Orlando
 William S. Jewell (1867–1956), American politician and lawyer

See also
 William Jewell College, a four-year college in Missouri